St. Peter's Church is the parish church of the German-speaking community in Copenhagen, Denmark. It is situated at the corner of Nørregade and Sankt Peders Stræde in the city's Latin Quarter. Built as a single-nave church in the mid-15th century, it is the oldest building in central Copenhagen. It is also notable for its extensive complex of sepulchral chapels.

History

Medieval parish church
St. Peter's Church was in the Middle Ages one out of four Catholic parish churches in Copenhagen. It is first mentioned in 1304 but was most likely founded in the 12th century. The first church burnt down in 1380 but was rebuilt shortly thereafter.

After the Reformation
After the Reformation the church building was for a while used as a canon and bell foundry.

German church
In 1585, Frederick II presented St. Peter's Church to his German-speaking subjects. The building was renovated by Hans van Steenwinckel the Elder who also added a gablet upper floor to the uncompleted tower, which was however replaced by a spire in the 17th century. The church became a centre for Copenhagen's political, economic, cultural and military elite, which, like the Royal Court, relied on German for everyday use.

The rapidly growing congregation made it necessary to expand the church in several stages. Christian IV added a northern transept in 1631 and a southern transept in 1634. Just 60 years later, Christian V extended the north transept with a further three severies. The distinctive sepulchral chapels arose between 1648 and 1740.

After the Fire of 1728

St. Peter's Church was severely damaged in the Copenhagen Fire of 1728. The interior was lost to the flames but the outer walls were left intact and the church could fairly easily be rebuilt by Johan Cornelius Krieger. The church was first given a short lantern spire which was replaced by the current copper-clad spire in 1756-57. The spire survived the British bombardment during the Battle of Copenhagen in 1807.

With the increasing tensions between Denmark and Germany in the middle of the 18th century, culminating in the First Schleswig War from 1848 to 1850, the church lost its special position and therefore members, prestige and financial support.

As time passed, it became an impossible task for the congregation to maintain the large building complex, and in 1994 the state took over the church back into its care. It was transferred to the Palaces and Properties Agency, which in the late 90s carried out extensive restoration and partial restructuring under the direction of architect and professor Hans Munk Hansen.

Architecture
St. Peter's Church was originally built as a single-nave church but with Christian IV's addition of the northern and southern transepts, it received the cruciform layout which characterizes it today. Most of the church, including the nave, the choir and the lower part of the tower, dates back to the middle of the 15th century. The main entrance is located in the southern transept and is marked by a richly carved Baroque portal from 1731, carved by the sculptor Diderik Gercken. The spire from 1756 to 1757 is built in the Rococo style to the design of carpenter

Sepulchral chapels

The church has an extensive complex of sepulchral chapels which was commenced in 1643 and not completed until 1681-83 when Hans van Steenwinckel the Youngest completed a three wing chapel towards Larslejstræde. The complex contains numerous tombs and epitaphs of important German families in Denmark. Beneath the tombs contain the sarcofages of the most distinguished family members while other coffins are placed in three to four layers in underground crypts.

Many of the chapels are made by Johannes Wiedewelt and Andreas Weidenhaupt. Amongst the chapels lies the idyllic 'herb garden'.

Interments
The interments include:

 Gottfried Becker (1767-1845), royal pharmacist
 Charlotte Dorothea Biehl  (1731–1788), playwright 
 Conrad Biermann von Ehrenschild (1629–1698), civil servant 
 Christian Brandt
 Peter Brandt and Abigael Marie Brandt, née von Stöcken
 Robert Colnet
 Peter Cramer (1726–1782), painter
 Friederich Ehbisch  (1672-1748), sculptor
 Valentin von Eickstedt (1669-1718), officer 
 Christoffer Gabel (1617–1673), statesman
 Friedrich Carl von Gram
 Christian Gyldenløve (moved 1734 from Vor Frue Kirke)
 Wolfgang Haffner
 Nicolaj Helt
 Catharine Marie von Holstein
 Hans Friedrich von Holstein
 Johan Georg Holstein
 Albrecht Itzen
 Johan Boye Junge
 Kristian Kongstad
 Abraham Lehn
 Christian Lente
 Theodor Lente
 Niels Banner Matthisen
 Reinhold Meier
 Wigand Michelbecker
 Gerhard Morell
 Carl von Müller
 Otto Frederik Müller
 Bernhard Møllmann
 Christian Nerger
 Abraham Pelt
 Christian Siegfried von Plessen
 Carl Adolph von Plessen
 Marcus Gerhard Rosencrone
 Ernst Schimmelmann
 Johan Sigismund Schulin
 Henrik Stampe
 possibly Johann Friedrich Struensee (since the 1920s)
 Sir Walter Titley, britisk ambassadør i Danmark
 Lorenz Tuxen
 Hans von Voscamp
 Georg Wilhelm Wahl
 Jørgen Walter  /died 1670), military officer
 Andreas Weyse
 Daniel Benjamin Weyse
 Just Wiedewelt (1677–1757), sculptor

Churchyard
 Ernst Henrich Berling  (1708–1750), printer and publisher
 Christian van Bracht (c. 1637 – 1720), court artist
 Johan van Bracht (died 1710), court artist
 Frederik Christian van Bracht (1720–1759), painter
 Constantin Brun  (1746–1836), businessman 
 Friederike Brun (1765–1835), writer and salonist
 Johannes Gottlieb de Bötticher  (1676–1762), physician
 Nicolai Eigtved (1701–1754), architect
 Christian Ulrik Foltmar  (c. 1716 - 1794) wallpaper weaver, painter of miniatures and organist
 Heinrich Egidius Gercken (died 1774), court gardener 
 Jonas Haas (1720–1775), printmaker
 Johann Christopher Heimbrod (1724– 1733), sculptor. stone carver and stucco artist
 Johann Friedrich Hännel (c. 1710 – 1761), sculptor
 Juliane Marie Jessen (1760–1832), author and translator
 Martin Lehmann  (1775–1856), civil servant 
 Ernst Heinrich Løffler (1723–1796), painter
 Balthasar Münter (1735–1793), priest 
 Friederich Münter (1761–1830), scholar, professor of theology
 Carl Probsthayn  (1770–1818), painter 
 Johan Henrich Schønheyder
 Johan Martin Schønheyder
 Johan Adam Sturmberg
 Johan Christopher Sturmberg
 Martin Zumpe (c. 1697 – 1753), master builder

St. Peter's Church today
The church is today owned by the Danish Palaces and Properties Agency but on a day-to-day basis the church is still used actively by the German-speaking Evangelical-Lutheran congregation with 900 members as part of the Danish National Church. The congregation arranges guided tours, concerts and other cultural events in the historic building. Together with the St. Peter's School and the St. Peter's Cultural Center, both of which are located on the church's premises, it forms a centre for German culture in Copenhagen.

In popular culture
The church is used as a location in the 1991 drama film Drengene fra Sankt Petri.

See also

 Christian's Church
 Reformed Church, Copenhagen

References

Lutheran churches in Copenhagen
Church of Denmark
Listed religious buildings and structures in Denmark
Copenhagen